James Bradford Means (born May 29, 1950) is a retired American racing driver and owner, who competed in the Winston Cup Series as an owner-driver. He is currently an adviser for Front Row Motorsports and owns his own team, Jimmy Means Racing.

He competed in NASCAR for eighteen years in mostly his own equipment, posting seventeen career top-tens. He made three career Busch Series starts in 1989, finishing 10th at Darlington Raceway. Following his retirement, Means worked as a crew chief in NASCAR, working for Bud Moore Engineering and Moy Racing. Means was part the Alabama Gang which included Bobby Allison, Donnie Allison, Neil Bonnett and Red Farmer and later Davey Allison, Hut Stricklin, Steve Grissom and Mike Alexander. 

Means' nickname "Smut" originated from his admiration for mechanic Smokey Yunick. Since the nickname "Smokey" was already taken in racing circles, Means' crew nicknamed him "Smut", the residue left behind by smoke.  

He is the father of Brad Means.

Local track career 
Means won dozens of late model races in Alabama and Tennessee in the early 1970s, including track championships at Huntsville Speedway and the historic Nashville Speedway USA.

Driving career 
Means made his Cup debut in 1976 at the Daytona 500, driving the number five Chevrolet for Bill Gray. He led one lap but finished 40th after an engine failure. He ran an additional eighteen races for Gray in the number 52 car with sponsorship from WIXC, finishing in eleventh place twice. The following season, Means drove twenty-six races and had a career-best six top-ten finishes, but due to twelve DNFs, he finished nineteenth in points.

In 1978, Means began running as an independent driver, except for the Winston 500, where he drove for Bill Champion. He had two top-tens and improved three spots to finish sixteenth in points. He received new sponsorship from Mr. Transmission, but only had one top-ten in 1979, forcing him to fall to 23rd in points. After a sponsorship change to Thompson Industries for 1980, Means failed to finish higher than 12th, but he was still able to move up to 17th in the standings. Broadway Motors became his new sponsor in 1981, and after two top-tens, he continued to move up to fourteenth in points. In 1982, he was able to garner an additional pair of ninth-place runs, and finished a career-best 11th in points. It also marked the first time in his career he ran every race on the schedule.

Means had the highest finish of his career in 1983, when he had a seventh-place run at Talladega. Combined with two other top-tens, he dropped seven spots in the standings. During the 1984, Means suffered injuries in a crash at Talladega Superspeedway, forcing him to miss several races. He did not have a top-ten finish over the next two years, and he lost his Broadway sponsorship, picking up funding from Voyles Auto Savage in late 1986. He also switched his manufacturer to Pontiac.

In 1987, Eureka Vacuum Cleaners became Means' new sponsor, and he had the last top-ten of his career at Richmond International Raceway. He dropped to what was at the time the lowest points finish of his career (30th) in 1988, and continued to struggle in 1989, failing to qualify for several races and dropping another spot in the standings despite a new sponsor in Alka-Seltzer. Means had already chosen to skip two races in favor of Bobby Hillin Jr. in 1991 after being involved with J. D. McDuffie's fatal crash; he continued to relinquish the ride to Mike Wallace at the end of the season.

After losing the Alka-Seltzer sponsorship, Means continued to drive a part-time schedule. After getting part-time funding from NAPA and Hurley Limo, Means ran eighteen races in 1993.

Means had planned to race again in 1994 for his own team. Speedweeks 1994 was marred by the deaths of fellow Alabama driver Neil Bonnett, and reigning Goody's Dash Series Champion Rodney Orr. The deaths of Bonnett and Orr convinced Means that he had no more reason to be racing. Means announced his retirement in the days following qualifying for the 1994 Daytona 500. He was winless in 455 starts.

In 1995 he had a brief stint as team manager for the Bud Moore-owned, Lake Speed-driven No. 15 Ford Quality Care Thunderbird.

Car owner

Means continued to own NASCAR cars through the 1990s and 2000s, primarily in the Busch Series (now Xfinity Series). In 2012, he was a part-owner of the new Hamilton Means Racing team, which fielded his traditional number 52.

Motorsports career results

NASCAR
(key) (Bold – Pole position awarded by qualifying time. Italics – Pole position earned by points standings or practice time. * – Most laps led)

Winston Cup Series

Daytona 500

Busch Series

References

External links

Jimmy Means NASCAR Owner

Living people
1950 births
Sportspeople from Huntsville, Alabama
Racing drivers from Alabama
NASCAR drivers
NASCAR team owners
NASCAR crew chiefs
Alabama Gang
Hendrick Motorsports drivers